Leyanis Pérez Hernández (born 10 January 2002) is a Cuban athlete who competes in the triple jump. She finished fourth at the 2022 World Athletics Championships.

Her jump of 14.15m on 21 March 2020 was the fifteenth longest jump in the world that year, and the world leading distance by a junior.

She made the qualifying mark for the delayed 2020 Olympic Games in May 2021 by jumping 14.46m (wind assisted) and then 14.32m.

References

Living people
2002 births
Cuban female triple jumpers